John Ashley Soames Grenville (11 January 1928 – 7 March 2011) was a historian of the modern world.

Biography
Grenville was born Hans Guhrauer in Berlin, Germany on 11 January 1928. In 1939, escaped the Holocaust via Kindertransport with his brothers Julian and Walter. He officially changed his name in 1949 to John Ashley Soames Grenville upon receiving British citizenship. His mother died in a concentration camp, and his father had limited means to support the family.

After attending preparatory school in Essex, he attended Cambridge Technical School. He then took a gardening job in Peterhouse, Cambridge. He was given access to the library at the college, but only if he promised not to apply there. Thus, he began to study on his own during the day and take classes at Birkbeck College, London in the evening. Grenville was given the London County Council Grant, which enabled him to attend the University of London. He then attended Birkbeck College and the London School of Economics.  He studied under Sir Charles Webster and received a First Class Honours Degree in History in 1951 and a PhD, for which he was awarded the Hutchinson Medal, in 1953. His dissertation was entitled Lord Salisbury and Foreign Policy: The Close of the 19th Century (1964). He was later a Commonwealth Fund Fellow at Yale University.

Grenville began his academic career at the University of Nottingham where he was successively Assistant Lecturer, Lecturer and Reader in History.  He was Professor of International History at the University of Leeds from 1966 to 1969, then Professor and Head of the Department of Modern History at the University of Birmingham from 1969 to 1994. He later worked at Hamburg University and London's Leo Baeck Institute.

Grenville focused on portraying himself as an Englishman with German roots; thus, most of his studies revolved around this. He developed the international studies degree at Leeds, which focused on the use of film as a tool for understanding history.

Grenville married twice. He met Betty Anne Rosenberg through a Harkness Fellowship at Yale; they had three sons together. However, she soon died, and left Grenville with three sons to raise on his own. Patricia Carnie comforted him throughout the loss, and they married in 1975 and continued to have children.

Grenville died on 7 March 2011.  Patricia, his sons, Murray, Edward and George, his daughters, Claire and Annabelle, survived him.

Memorial
John A. S. Grenville PhD Studentship in Modern Jewish History and Culture awarded by the Leo Baeck Institute.

Publications
 The Jews and Germans of Hamburg. The Destruction of a Civilization 1790 – 1945. Taylor & Francis, London 2011, 
 Preface to Leo Baeck Institute Yearbook LV (2010)
 Year Book of the Leo Baeck Institute, Oxford: Berghahn Books, 2007, (Co-Ed. with Raphael Gross)
 A history of the world from the 20th to the 21st century . Routledge, London 2005, 
 The Collins history of the world in the twentieth century . London 1994,  
 The major treaties since 1945 : a history and guide with texts. with Bernard Wasserstein, London 1987 
 A World History of the 20th Century. London 1980, 
 Europe reshaped: 1848-1878 . Hassocks 1976, 
 Nazi Germany. Together with Ruth Barker, History through the newsreel. the 1930s, Basingstoke 1976, 
 Film as history : the nature of film evidence. Birmingham 1971, 
 The major international treaties, 1914-1945 : a history and guide with texts. London 1974, 
 The major international treaties, 1914-1973 : a history and guide with texts. London 1974, 
 The coming of the Europeans : a history of European discovery and settlement, 1415-1775  with G.J. Fuller, London 1966
  Politics, Strategy, and American Diplomacy: Studies in American Foreign Policy 1873-1917.  ( Co-Author G.B. Young), 1966
 Lord Salisbury and Foreign Policy: The Close of the Nineteenth Century Lord Salisbury and Foreign Policy.  University of London 1964, later edition Athlone press, London 1970

References

Historians of World War I
Historians of World War II
English historians
Historians of fascism
Historians of Nazism
Kindertransport refugees
1928 births
2011 deaths
Historians of the British Empire
Academics of the University of Leeds
Academics of the University of Birmingham
Naturalised citizens of the United Kingdom
English people of German-Jewish descent
German emigrants to England